Arcella is a genus of testate amoebae in the order Arcellinida, usually found in freshwaters and mosses, and rarely in soils. A key characteristic of Arcella is the circular test with a hole on its center from where finger-like pseudopods emerge. It is one of the largest testacean genera.

Anatomy
An Arcella is typically enclosed in a chitinous, umbrella-shaped test (or shell) that has a single central aperture through which the pseudopods – which are used for locomotion – extend out. In some species the aperture is surrounded by a ring of pores. The test is composed of organic material with a diameter of up to 300 µm and is transparent or light-yellow-colored in young Arcella, but browns while aging due to the progressive deposition of iron and manganese compounds. Contrary to other genera, no gravel chips or other foreign bodies are inserted to strengthen the housing.

Different species of Arcella can have different number of nuclei, ranging from a single nucleus, as in some A. hemisphaerica, up to 200 nuclei, as in A. megastoma, though the majority is binucleate. They also have many contractile vacuoles, and can develop vacuoles of carbon dioxide in their cytoplasm to float up to the surface of the water.

Nutrition and distribution
Arcella inhabit freshwater pools, eutrophic waters, marshes, mosses, as well as wet foliage. Few species can also be found in soils. They nourish on diatoms, unicellular green algae or animal protozoa such as flagellates and ciliates.

Most species are worldwide-distributed, but some have restricted distributions, e.g. A. brasiliensis and A. rota which are endemic to South America.

They eat by stretching out their pseudopods to surround the food and bring it back to the microorganism.

Species
Over 130 species and subspecies of the genus Arcella have been described so far. Species include:

Arcella arenaria  Greeff, 1866 
Arcella artocrea Leidy, 1876 
Arcella brasiliensis Cunha, 1913 
Arcella catinus Penard, 1890 
Arcella conica (Playfair, 1918) 
 Arcella costata Ehrenberg, 1847 
Arcella dentata Ehrenberg, 1830 
Arcella discoides Ehrenberg, 1843 
 Arcella discoides var. scutelliformis  Playfair, 1918 
Arcella excavata Cunningham, 1919 
 Arcella gandalfi Féres et al., 2016 
Arcella gibbosa Penard, 1890 
Arcella hemisphaerica Perty, 1852 
 Arcella intermedia (Deflandre, 1928) Tsyganov & Mazei 2006 
Arcella megastoma Penard, 1902 
 Arcella mitrata Leidy, 1876 
 Arcella multilobata  Golemansky, 1964   
 Arcella ovaliformis Chardez and Beyens, 1987  
 Arcella rota Daday, 1905 
Arcella peruviana Reczuga et al., 2015 
 Arcella rotundata Playfair, 1918 
Arcella vulgaris Ehrenberg, 1830

References

External links

Amoebozoa genera
Tubulinea
Taxa named by Christian Gottfried Ehrenberg